The Mindless Ones are fictional monsters appearing in American comic books published by Marvel Comics. Their first appearance was in Strange Tales #127 (Dec. 1964).

They are extra-dimensional creatures summoned via magic to do the bidding of others (they have no will of their own). They appear to have a thick, roughly humanoid shape standing taller than most men and a hide that appears to be made of rock. They have no faces to speak of except a single glowing eye. They have savage dispositions and minimal intelligence.

Publication history
The Mindless Ones first appeared in Strange Tales #127 (Dec. 1964), and were created by Stan Lee and Steve Ditko.

The Mindless Ones have also appeared in Darkhawk #19-20 (Sept.–Oct. 1992), Sleepwalker #17 (Oct. 1992), Doctor Strange, Sorcerer Supreme #82 (Oct. 1995), Marvel Boy vol. 2, #5-6 (Dec. 2000, March 2001), Fantastic Four #70 (Aug. 2003), The Amazing Spider-Man vol. 2 #57-#58 (Nov. 2003), The Amazing Spider-Man #500 (Dec. 2003), and Nextwave: Agents of H.A.T.E. #7-8 (Nov. 2006), among other comics.

Fictional history
Long ago, the wizard King Olnar sat on the throne of the Dark Dimension. He is visited by Umar and Dormammu, siblings of a race of magical energy beings called the Faltine. During this time, Olnar melds the Mindless Ones' home dimension to the Dark Dimension. They rampage throughout the lands, killing many, including Olnar, and almost slaying the two Faltine. The siblings create a barrier to keep them contained.

From that point they are most often seen in the employ of Dormammu, who develops an ability to slightly control their actions. They have also been utilized by others such as Doctor Doom, Dr. Midas (in the pages of Marvel Boy) and a fellow Faltine named Rorkannu (in Nextwave: Agents of H.A.T.E.).

Dr. Doom uses them after gaining high levels of magical power via a deal with demonic entities. The Mindless Ones are utilized to beat on Ben Grimm, a member of the Fantastic Four, in a test of Grimm's durability.

Sleepwalker
When Spider-Man is banished to the Dark Dimension by a brainwashed Portal, he is attacked by a group of Mindless Ones. To rescue him, Darkhawk and Sleepwalker battle the Brotherhood of Evil Mutants and break Sauron's control over Portal so they could retrieve Spider-Man. A gang of Mindless Ones follow Spider-Man through the portal leading back to Earth, but the three heroes beat  them back through the gateway before Portal seals it.

Amazing Spider-Man
In another, separate incident, they invade and destroyed much of New York City's famed Times Square. A force that consists of Spider-Man, Doctor Strange, Cyclops, Thor, Iron Man, Mr. Fantastic, Invisible Girl and the Human Torch help stop them, mainly by creating barriers. It is revealed this is the first instance Spider-Man has encountered these creatures. The Mindless Ones are temporarily defeated when Mr. Fantastic creates a machine that manipulates their magical energies, drawing them back to where they came from. This, unfortunately, results in the temporary return of Dormammu. Dr. Strange confronts the evil wizard. A punch from a single Mindless One sends Spider-Man straight into the magic Strange is utilizing, resulting in a time travel trip. Spider-Man sees a future where the Mindless Ones have reduced Times Square to rubble and killed Ben Grimm and Thor. A future Mary Jane is chased by a batch of Mindless Ones and despite Spider-Man's efforts, she is killed.

Further time-travel allows Spider-Man to prevent the usage of the machine in the first place. Doctor Strange's magic is what banishes the Mindless Ones, leaving Times Square damaged but still standing.

Around this time, a single Mindless One appears as a minion of the villain Doctor Midas.

Nextwave
Rorkannu, who physically resembles Dormammu and claims to be lord of the Dark Dimension, is stated to control a group of Mindless Ones. Emerging from a portal in a public restroom, they rampage through a small Colorado town, killing everyone they see, then wearing their clothing and behaving like them.

The group known as Nextwave slays the Mindless Ones. Rorkannu, in a monologue, reveals he is summoning the army because he feels their lack of distinguishing features and similar temperaments make them suitable to replace the human race. His lair is discovered by the hero known as the 'Captain'. His summoning circle is destroyed. Rorkannu himself is severely beaten and left to an uncertain fate.

Cable and Deadpool
The Mindless Ones appeared in an issue of Cable & Deadpool in which Deadpool and Bob, Agent of HYDRA encounter them in their own dimension. The two are being manipulated by Doctor Strange. The Mindless Ones alternately attack and worship the two protagonists, evidently mistaking the light from a glow stick for some sort of magical power, and revering whoever it seemed to be emanating from. Deadpool and Bob end up causing the deaths of several Mindless Ones as a needed sacrifice to close down a magical catastrophe threatening innocent lives.

Captain Britain and MI13
Plokta, a Duke of Hell, decided to conquer the world exponentially from a tower block in Birmingham. He used the collected magical energy of people captured within its rooms to create an army of Mindless Ones, but was eventually stopped by Captain Britain and MI13. Plokta was revealed to be the original creator of the Mindless Ones, responsible for them within the hierarchy of Hell.

Nova
They are also referenced here as Neutron Slaves. They were used to mine Neutron Stars and many other ultra-dense gravity sites. They rebelled against their slave masters and began manufacturing a drug called "Krush" from the surface of Neutron Stars. They are members of the Black Hole Sons and it seems they are led by a being called The Mind who is currently held prisoner in a Nova Corps ship.

Mindless Ones are used when Dormammu invades the realm of Limbo, an area usually ruled by Illyana Rasputin.

Original Sin
During the "Original Sin"' storyline, a Mindless One was wrecking New York and smacking the Thing around. Spider-Man shows up to give Thing a hand. Spider-Man recognizes the Mindless One and realizes that they are not supposed to be telepathic. The Mindless One screams in agony over the things he has seen and the things he has done. Thing realizes he is wielding the Ultimate Nullifier and tries to talk the Mindless One down. However, it doesn't work and the Mindless shoots himself with it. By this time, Nick Fury and the Avengers arrive. Captain America wants the Ultimate Nullifier left alone until it is contained and Fury declares the battle zone a murder scene. Elsewhere, a group of villains realize the other Mindless Ones are evolving.

Several Mindless Ones, now with sentience, are seen assisting in a mystical teaching academy run by Doctor Stephen Strange.

Powers and abilities
Mindless Ones are capable of firing energy blasts from the hole that makes up their faces. They are superhumanly strong and durable, although their exact power levels vary from appearance to appearance.

In other media

Television
 The Mindless Ones appear in The Super Hero Squad Show episode "Enter Dormammu".
 The Mindless Ones appear in Hulk and the Agents of S.M.A.S.H..
 The Mindless Ones appear in the Ultimate Spider-Man episode "Cloak and Dagger".
 The Mindless Ones appear in Avengers Assemble.

Video games
The Mindless Ones appear as enemies in the Facebook game Marvel: Avengers Alliance.

References

External links
 Mindless Ones at Marvel.com
 Character Biography of Dormammu including info on Mindless Ones

Characters created by Stan Lee
Characters created by Steve Ditko
Comics characters introduced in 1964
Marvel Comics characters with superhuman strength
Marvel Comics supervillains